Now Hear This was a self-produced & distributed album by country rock band the Ozark Mountain Daredevils, sold only at concerts on cassette tape.

Track listing

"I'm Still Dreamin'"
"Everywhere She Goes"
"Hilltop Girl"
"Over Again"
"Love Is Calling"
"There Oughta Be a Law"
"True Love"
"Gonna Buy Me a Car"
"(Flame of) Laredo"
"The River"

Personnel
Steve Cash - harps, vocals
John Dillon - guitar, vocals, mandolini, fiddle
Mike (Supe) Granda - bass, vocals
Ron Gremp - drums
D. Clinton Thompson - lead guitar

The Ozark Mountain Daredevils albums
1990 albums